Maziar Behrooz (born 1959), is an Iranian-born American historian of modern Iran, and educator. He lives in Berkeley, California.

Biography   
Maziar Behrooz was born in 1959 in Tehran to parents Sara Khosrovi-Azarbaijani and Jahangir (Changiz) Behrouz. He received his high school diploma from the United Kingdom. 

Behrooz received his B.A degree in History-Political Science from Saint Mary's College of California (1982), his M.A. degree in Modern History of Europe from San Francisco State University (1986), and his PH.D. in Modern History of the Near East from University of California, Los Angeles (1993).

He has taught at a number of universities and colleges including the University of California, Berkeley; Saint Mary's College of California; Stanford University; Bridgewater State College; and is currently an associate professor at the History Department of San Francisco State University where he teaches various courses concerning the modern history of the Middle East.

He has authored numerous articles and book chapters on Iran and is the author of two books on the history of the left movement in Iran. His first book is Rebels with a Cause (1999), which was based on his doctoral research. According to WorldCat, the book is held in 249 libraries and has been translated into Persian (2001) and Turkish (2006). One of his recent research project is about late-18th century to early 19th-century encounters between Persia and the Western world.

Publications

References

External links
 Faculty profile at San Francisco State University

1959 births
Living people
Writers from Tehran
Writers from Berkeley, California
San Francisco State University alumni
Saint Mary's College of California alumni
University of California, Los Angeles alumni
Iranian emigrants to the United States
Historians from California